Dávid Meliš (born 18 September 2001) is a Slovak footballer who plays for Rohožník in 2. Liga as a forward.

Club career

FK Senica
Meliš made his Fortuna Liga debut for Senica against Železiarne Podbrezová on 24 May 2019.

References

External links
 FK Senica official club profile
 Futbalnet profile
 
 Fortuna Liga profile

2001 births
Living people
Slovak footballers
Association football forwards
FK Senica players
FC Rohožník players
Slovak Super Liga players
3. Liga (Slovakia) players
2. Liga (Slovakia) players